The 2016 6 Hours of Shanghai was an endurance sports car racing event held at the Shanghai International Circuit, Shanghai, China on 4—6 November 2016, and served as the eighth race of the 2016 FIA World Endurance Championship. Porsche's Timo Bernhard, Brendon Hartley and Mark Webber won the race driving the No. 1 Porsche 919 Hybrid car.

Qualifying

Qualifying result
Pole position in Class is in bold.

Race

Race result
Class winners are denoted with bold.

Notes

References

6 Hours of Shanghai
Shanghai
Shanghai
6 Hours of Shanghai